Steel Pulse FC is an American semiprofessional soccer team based in Baltimore, Maryland. The team, which was founded in 2019, currently plays in 4th tier league NISA Nation and plays its home games in the Marriotts Ridge High School.

History
Steel Pulse FC has been founded in 2019 in Baltimore, Maryland. The club immediately won the Spring 2019 and Fall 2019 Maryland Major Soccer League (6th tier) seasons, subsequently ranking up to Eastern Premier Soccer League (5th tier), and after winning the 2021 Mid-Atlantic Region regular season the club made its debut into NISA Nation (4th tier league) into the Northeast Region as founder club.

Honours
Maryland Major Soccer League Spring 2019 Champion
Maryland Major Soccer League Fall 2019 Champion
Maryland Major Soccer League Spring 2021 Champion
EPSL Mid Atlantic Region 2021 Champion

Year-by-year

References

Soccer clubs in Maryland